Tagamõisa may refer to several places in Estonia:
Tagamõisa, Saare County, village in Estonia
Tagamõisa, Viljandi County, village in Estonia